ARHS may refer to:

Schools
Algonquin Regional High School, Northborough, Massachusetts
Amherst Regional High School (Amherst, Massachusetts)
Amherst Regional High School (Amherst, Nova Scotia)
Apponequet Regional High School, Lakeville, Massachusetts
Archbishop Riordan High School, San Francisco, California
Ashley Ridge High School, Summerville, South Carolina
Auburn Riverside High School, Auburn, Washington

Historical societies
Anthracite Railroads Historical Society, Pennsylvania, United States
Australian Railway Historical Society

Other
Arhaus, an American furniture retailer, by Nasdaq stock symbol